Ali Çetinkaya railway station is the main railway station in Afyonkarahisar, Turkey. The station is one of Afyon's two railway stations, the other being Afyon City railway station. Ali Çetinkaya station was built in 1895 by the Anatolian Railway as part of their main line between İstanbul and Konya. The Turkish State Railways acquired the Anatolian Railway in 1927. In 1936 the State Railways connected the two station together with the opening of the Afyon-Karakuyu line. The station was rebuilt with a station building half the size of the one in Ankara and inaugurated on July 18, 1939, by president İsmet İnönü and Minister of Transport Ali Çetinkaya. Ali Çetinkaya station was always the busier station of the two and after 1939 all railway traffic in Afyon was handled from this station. When Ali Çetinkaya died in 1949, the station was renamed in his honor.

References

Railway stations opened in 1895
Buildings and structures in Afyonkarahisar
Railway stations in Afyonkarahisar Province
Transport in Afyonkarahisar Province
Art Deco railway stations